Choi Choon-ok (born 15 May 1965 in Pyeongtaek, Gyeonggi) is a South Korean former field hockey player who competed in the 1988 Summer Olympics.

Education
Kyung Hee University

References

External links
 

1965 births
Living people
South Korean female field hockey players
Olympic field hockey players of South Korea
Field hockey players at the 1988 Summer Olympics
Olympic silver medalists for South Korea
Olympic medalists in field hockey
Kyung Hee University alumni
Sportspeople from Gyeonggi Province
Asian Games medalists in field hockey
Field hockey players at the 1986 Asian Games
Asian Games gold medalists for South Korea
Medalists at the 1986 Asian Games
Medalists at the 1988 Summer Olympics
20th-century South Korean women
21st-century South Korean women